Langona zimbabwensis is a jumping spider species in the genus Langona that lives in Zimbabwe. The species name is derived from the name of the country. The male was first described in 2011.

References

Endemic fauna of Zimbabwe
Salticidae
Spiders described in 2011
Spiders of Africa
Taxa named by Wanda Wesołowska